Wakaw, Saskatchewan, is a town 90 km (56 miles) northeast of Saskatoon and 66 km (41 miles) south of Prince Albert. It is about halfway between the two cities and is served by Highway 2, Highway 41 and Highway 312. Wakaw is in hilly partially forested country east of the South Saskatchewan River. The area is part of the aspen parkland biome.
Wakaw is about 11 miles north of the town of Cudworth. 
Wakaw is a Cree word meaning "crooked". The name was taken from nearby Wakaw Lake and applied to the town.

History

The area was peopled primarily by settlers of Eastern European origin. The town was home to Prime Minister John Diefenbaker and his first wife Edna Brower. Diefenbaker opened his first law office in Wakaw from 1919 to 1925.

Wakaw was founded on December 26, 1911 after 21 residents petitioned the Department of Municipal Affairs, asking for the incorporation of the Village of Wakaw. It was located on Section 30, Township 42, Range 26, west of the 2nd Meridian, land donated to the town by Anthony Goller who  immigrated to Canada in 1902. When the railroad was built the town was moved to its present location. On August 1, 1953 Wakaw was incorporated as a town.

The community recognized its 100th anniversary by holding Centennial Celebrations on July 21 to 31, 2011.

There are about 800 cabins at nearby Wakaw Lake, some of which are occupied year round.

Demographics 

Amenities
Businesses in Wakaw include grocery stores, a pharmacy, gas stations, restaurants, insurance agencies and six places of worship.

Notable people 
 Dave Balon - professional ice hockey player and coach
 Harvey Cenaiko - former Solicitor General of Alberta and policeman
 Tom Courchene - economist and professor; Officer of the Order of Canada
 John Diefenbaker - 13th Prime Minister of Canada
 James Latos - professional ice hockey player for the New York Rangers and coach 
 Dave Michayluk - professional ice hockey player for the Philadelphia Flyers and Pittsburgh Penguins 
 Linden Vey - professional ice hockey player for the ZSC Lions organization in the National League (NL); Olympic bronze medalist PyeongChang 2018

See also 

 List of communities in Saskatchewan
List of place names in Canada of Indigenous origin
 List of towns in Saskatchewan
Wakaw Airport

References

External links

Towns in Saskatchewan
Populated places established in 1911
1911 establishments in Saskatchewan
Hoodoo No. 401, Saskatchewan
Fish Creek No. 402, Saskatchewan
Division No. 15, Saskatchewan